Harry Jacks (born Herman Jekeles on 5 August 1908–19 August 1994) was a New Zealand soldier, plant pathologist, lecturer and forester. He was born in the Bukowina, Austria-Hungary,  Chernivtsi Oblast, Ukraine.

References

1908 births
1994 deaths
New Zealand educators
New Zealand academics
New Zealand military personnel
New Zealand biologists
New Zealand foresters
People from Chernivtsi Oblast
Bukovina Jews
New Zealand Jews
New Zealand people of Ukrainian-Jewish descent
Hungarian foresters
20th-century biologists